The Late Bloomer is a 2016 American comedy-drama film directed by Kevin Pollak and written by Gary Rosen, Joe Nussbaum, Paul A. Kaplan & Mark Torgove, and Kyle Cooper & Austyn Jeffs. The film stars Johnny Simmons, Maria Bello,  Brittany Snow, Jane Lynch, J. K. Simmons, Kumail Nanjiani,  Beck Bennett, and Paul Wesley, and is based on journalist Ken Baker's autobiography Man Made: A Memoir of My Body, in which he detailed experiencing puberty for the first time at age 27.

The film received its world premiere at the San Diego Film Festival, where it won Best Comedy. It opened with both a limited release theatrically and through video on demand on October 7, 2016, released by Momentum Pictures. The film received generally negative reviews.

Plot
Dr. Peter Newmans is a 30-year-old sex therapist who lives a quiet life alone, silently crushing on his pretty neighbor, Michelle. He is known for being a very non-sexual person, and has written a book about how sex is not a necessity.

Michelle breaks up with her workaholic boyfriend, and Peter takes the opportunity to comfort her. In her vulnerability, she kisses him. Suddenly he gets a really bad headache and has to leave. Around that time he had been getting a few really bad migraines but the reason is not revealed until later.

The next morning, he is persuaded by his friends to join them at their weekend basketball game, where he is hit in the groin and falls to the ground. He attends an emergency room, where his friends say he may have hit his head, so the doctor orders a head CT scan, followed by an MRI.

During his initial physical examination, the doctor has noticed Peter's under-developed testicles, and becomes increasingly concerned. It is discovered he has a long-term benign brain tumor pressed against his pituitary gland, which has caused prolactin to be released into his system while suppressing his testosterone production. This means that he has never transitioned to puberty.

Elated to learn that he is not a "freak", Peter insists that a procedure be undertaken immediately to remove the tumor. After a successful excision, he stays with his parents to recover. A little later, he wakes with his first erection, signalling his transition into puberty.

With the onset of puberty, Peter experiences some of its less welcome side-effects, including mood swings, strong sexual desires, voice changes, and severe acne. After Michelle leaves for a cooking retreat with Bobby Flay, his symptoms become progressively more severe. During a FaceTime call with her, he lashes out because of his unfamiliar feelings of jealousy.

After Michelle returns, she agrees to a date with Peter, but he blows it by behaving like a jerk. He becomes depressed and tries to receive oral sex from one of his patients, but is caught and subsequently fired by his boss. He is forced to come to terms with his situation, and has a heart-to-heart with his father over what it means to "be a man". Reflecting on his anti-sex book, Peter concludes that a person should have all the (consensual) sex possible, and society should cease to sex-shame individuals because "it's awesome". Peter eventually apologizes to Michelle, who becomes pregnant with his child. He writes a book for teenage boys about how to become proper men, and he and Michelle live happily ever after.

Cast

 Johnny Simmons as Dr. Peter Newmans, a sex therapist.
 J. K. Simmons as James Newmans, Peter's father.
 Maria Bello as Brenda Newmans, Peter's mother.
 Brittany Snow as Michelle, the woman next door, pursued by Peter.
 Jane Lynch as Caroline, head of the office where Peter works.
 Paul Wesley as Charlie
 Kumail Nanjiani as Rich, Peter's friend and another wingman.
 Beck Bennett as Luke, Peter's friend and wingman.
 Illeana Douglas as Linda
 Ken Marino as Dr. Hanson
 Sam Robards as Dr. Lawson
 Blake Cooper as Josh, Peter's young friend.
 Vanessa Ragland as Jenny
 Lenora Crichlow as Nikki
 Charlotte McKinney as Patient
 Jason Antoon as Kenny
 Matt Jones as Max
 Greg Cromer as Paramedic
 Brian Doyle-Murray as Stagehand

Production
Alcon Entertainment acquired the film rights to the journalist Ken Baker's autobiographical book Man Made: A Memoir of My Body in 2008, with a script set to be written by Gary Rosen. The film would be based on the true story of Baker, who went through his puberty in three weeks at the age of 27. The delaying of his puberty and normal development was caused by a benign tumor in his brain. The film's titling as The Late Bloomer was first announced in January 2010, as Alcon was developing the film. At the time, Andrew Kosove and Broderick Johnson were attached as producers, and the studio was re-imagining the idea into a comedy by hiring Joe Nussbaum to write a new draft of the script.

In October 2012, it was announced that the film was to be directed by Randall Einhorn and would star Elijah Wood. The script had been written by Nussbaum, and rewritten by Paul A. Kaplan & Mark Torgove. The film was set to be produced by Jesse Israel of Ineffable Pictures and Brent Emery of Coup d'Etat Films, with financing by Dignity Film Finance.

In May 2015, it was announced that the film would now be directed by Kevin Pollak, making his narrative debut. Raphael Kryszek and Israel would produce the film for Ineffable, along with Heidi Jo Markel for Eclectic. In August 2015, a new cast was announced, including Johnny Simmons in the lead role of sex therapist Dr. Peter Newmans, whose experiences mirror those of Baker in real life. Jane Lynch would play Caroline, head of the office where he works, Maria Bello and J. K. Simmons his parents, Brittany Snow the woman he pursues, and Beck Bennett, Kumail Nanjiani, and Blake Cooper his friends. Other cast members include Paul Wesley, Ken Marino, Illeana Douglas, Charlotte McKinney, Vanessa Ragland, and Lenora Crichlow. The latest draft of the film was revealed to have been written by Kyle Cooper and Austyn Jeffs, and Conor Charles was announced as co-producer.

Filming
Principal photography on the film began in late August 2015 in Los Angeles, and wrapped in Bulgaria on September 5, 2015.

Release and reception
In April 2016, Momentum Pictures acquired U.S distribution rights to the film. It had its world premiere at the San Diego Film Festival on September 30, 2016, where it won Best Comedy. It was released in a theatrical limited release and through video on demand on October 7, 2016.

On review aggregator Rotten Tomatoes, the film holds an approval rating of 20% based on 10 reviews, with an average rating of 4.5/10. On Metacritic, the film has a weighted average score of 34 out of 100, based on 7 critics, indicating "generally unfavorable reviews."

The Hollywood Reporter wrote that while Johnny Simmons fits his role perfectly, and secondary actors such as J.K. Simmons, Jane Lynch, Laraine Newman, Illeana Douglas, Maria Bello and Brian Doyle-Murray, have fun in their stereotypical scenes, J.K. Simmons and Maria Bello in particular seem overqualified for their roles.

References

External links
 
 
 

2016 films
2016 comedy-drama films
2016 directorial debut films
2010s sex comedy films
Adultery in films
American comedy-drama films
American sex comedy films
Comedy films based on actual events
Drama films based on actual events
Films about diseases
Films about puberty
Films about virginity
Films based on memoirs
Films scored by Walter Murphy
Films shot in Los Angeles
Films shot in Bulgaria
2010s English-language films
2010s American films